Tramar is a given name. Notable people with the name include:

 Tramar Dillard, birth name of Flo Rida (born 1979), American rapper, singer, and songwriter
 Tramar Sutherland (born 1989), Canadian basketball player

Masculine given names